Nemanja Subotić (born 23 January 1992) is a Serbian footballer who plays for Radnik Surdulica.

Club career

Budućnost Dobanovci
Born in Belgrade, Subotić played with several local clubs in his early years, including youth teams of Radnički Beograd, Zemun, Teleoptik and Rad. Subotić started his senior career with Budućnost Dobanovci, winning the Belgrade Zone League for the 2011–12 season. He made a total of 50 appearances and scored 7 goals in the Serbian League Belgrade between 2012 and 2014. He spent the 2014–15 season playing with Serbian First League side Bežanija. In the first season of his second spell with Budućnost Dobanovci, Subotić scored 14 goals in 26 matches, helping the team to make a historical success winning the Serbian League Belgrade. He was also the best team scorer for the 2016–17 season with 13 goals in 29 matches in the Serbian First League, including a hat-trick against Dinamo Vranje. Subotić signed his first professional contract with the club in February 2017.

Vojvodina
On 30 May 2017, Subotić moved to Serbian SuperLiga side Vojvodina on a two-year deal. He made his debut for the club in a 2–1 victory over MFK Ružomberok in the first leg of the 2017–18 UEFA Europa League first qualifying round. Subotić made his Serbian SuperLiga debut on 21 July 2017, in a 1–0 home win versus Čukarički. He scored his first goal for Vojvodina in an away match against Radnik Surdulica the next week. Subotić collected 36 appearances and scored 6 goals in all competitions during the 2017–18 season. At the beginning of new season in the Serbian SuperLiga, Subotić converted his squad number to 23, which had previously worn by Marko Vukasović. Following two opening matches he missed under coach Aleksandar Veselinović, Subotić mutually terminated his contract with Vojvodina and left the club on a free transfer.

Style of play
Subotić mainly plays as a left-wing with the possibility to play on inverted side, as also the central winger position. Having creative abilities and good starting acceleration, Subotić affirmed himself as the most productive player in his first Serbian First League season with Budućnost Dobanovci being involved in actions for 20 scored goals.

Career statistics

Honours
Budućnost Dobanovci
 Belgrade Zone League: 2011–12
 Serbian League Belgrade: 2015–16

References

External links
 
 
 
 
 

1992 births
Living people
Footballers from Belgrade
Association football wingers
Serbian footballers
FK Budućnost Dobanovci players
FK Bežanija players
FK Vojvodina players
Serbian First League players
Serbian SuperLiga players
FC Taraz players
FK Radnik Surdulica players
Expatriate footballers in Slovakia
Expatriate footballers in Kazakhstan